Daniel Catovsky (19 September 1937 – 2 December 2022) was an Argentine-born British world authority on chronic lymphocytic leukaemia.

Catovsky was born in Buenos Aires, Argentina on 19 September 1937. He died on 2 December 2022, at the age of 85. Catovsky was survived by his two sons.

References

1937 births
2022 deaths